The steamship Verona was a small steamboat of the Puget Sound Mosquito Fleet.

Career
Verona was built in 1910 at the Martinolich shipyard at Dockton, Washington.  The vessel is best known for an event which occurred on November 5, 1916.  The vessel was transporting members of the Industrial Workers of the World to Everett, Washington, in connection with a labor dispute.  On arrival in Everett, a shooting broke out which has since become known as the Everett Massacre.  In 1923 Verona was owned by the Union Navigation Company, a  Poulsbo concern, which in that year sold the vessel to Kitsap County Transportation Co.  From 1935 to 1936 Verona was owned by the Puget Sound Navigation Company.

Disposition
The aging Verona burned after completing its last night run from Bainbridge Island on Jan 10, 1936. Fireboats concentrated on saving nearby steamers.

See also
 Calista (steamboat)

Notes

References
 Kline, M.S., and Bayless, G.A., Ferryboats -- A legend on Puget Sound, Bayless Books, Seattle, WA 1983 
 Newell, Gordon, Ships of the Inland Sea, Binford and Mort, Portland, OR (2nd Ed. 1960)
 Tacoma Public Library, http://www.cimorelli.com/cgi-bin/magellanscripts/ship_dates_volume.asp?ShipName=Verona+%28steamer%29

Steamboats of Washington (state)
Passenger ships of the United States
Propeller-driven steamboats of Washington (state)
Kitsap County Transportation Company
Puget Sound Navigation Company
Industrial Workers of the World in Washington (state)
Ships built in Dockton, Washington